Manuel Puig (10 August 1928 – 20 April 1961) was a Cuban rower. He competed in the men's coxed four event at the 1948 Summer Olympics. He was executed for his role in the Bay of Pigs Invasion.

References

External links
 

1928 births
1961 deaths
Cuban male rowers
Olympic rowers of Cuba
Rowers at the 1948 Summer Olympics
Sportspeople from Santiago de Cuba
People executed by Cuba by firing squad
Opposition to Fidel Castro
20th-century Cuban people